was a general in the Imperial Japanese Army in the Pacific War.

Biography
A native of Ibaraki prefecture, Iimura graduated from the 21st class of the Imperial Japanese Army Academy in 1909, and was assigned to the Imperial Guards 3rd Regiment. Simultaneously, he also attended class work at the Tokyo University of Foreign Studies, graduating in March 1917 with a degree in French. He then entered the 33rd class of the Army Staff College, emerging in 1919 as a captain in the infantry. After a short assignment with the Chosen Army in Korea and as an instructor at the Army Staff College, he was promoted to lieutenant colonel and assigned as military attaché to Turkey. during his time as military attache in Turkey he criticized Turkish General staff's lectures on Russo-Japanese War and sent a memo about inaccuracies in their published works. In return Turkish General Staff requested him to hold lectures about Russo-Japanese war in Ankara

After Iimura returned to Japan, he was promoted to colonel in August 1932 and served in various staff positions within the Imperial Japanese Army General Staff. He was given a field position as commander of the IJA 61st Infantry Regiment in March 1935.

With the start of the Second Sino-Japanese War, Iimura was promoted in March 1937 to major general. He was Commandant of the Army Staff College from 1938–1939, and transferred to Manchukuo to become Chief of Staff of the Kwantung Army from 1939-1940. He subsequently became commander in chief of the IJA 5th Army in Manchukuo from 1941-1943.  Iijuma was recalled to Japan in 1943 to resume his position as Commandant of the Army Staff College, but with the situation continuing to deteriorate for the Japanese in the southern front of the Pacific War, he was reassigned to a combat command as Chief of Staff of the Southern Army in 1944, and Commander in Chief of the depleted 2nd Area Army, based in Manchukuo from 1944-1945.  He returned to Japan shortly before the end of the war to assume command of the Tokyo Defense Army and Tokyo Divisional District in anticipation of the American invasion of the Japanese home islands. He was appointed Provost Marshal immediately before the end of the war in 1945.

References

Books

External links

Notes

1888 births
1976 deaths
Military personnel from Ibaraki Prefecture
Japanese generals
Japanese military personnel of World War II